Sol Invicto is an American music project operating as a private members association, founded by Richie Londres and Stephen Carpenter of Deftones, joined in the later years by UK drum and bass producer, Technical Itch. Music and merchandise is only available to members of the Sol Invicto Comiti, and not released or shared with the general public or industry.

History
The group was formed in 2008 by Richie Londres and Stephen Carpenter, joined in later years by the British producer Technical Itch. The group incorporated in 2017 and now operate as a private members association, they have never released music officially to the public, only demos exist prior to their incorporation. They released their first official album in 2017 to members of the “Sol Invicto Comiti” only, the group do not operate in any official capacity on any social media platforms and their music remains largely unheard by the general public.

Project members
Richie Londres - Founder & Composer
Technical Itch - Chief Operating Officer & Producer
Stephen Carpenter - Founder & Guitarist
Dan Foord - Drums

Discography
 Diamond Eyes (Official Remix) 2010 Warner Bros. Records
 You've Seen The Butcher (Official Remix) 2010 Warner Bros. Records
 "Morte Et Dabo" (Official Remix) 2011 Sumerian Records
 "A Lesson Never Learned" (Official Remix) 2011 Sumerian Records
 Initium (Album) 2017 Sol Invicto (Private Release)

References

Sources 
Sol Invicto (Deftones, Etc.) To Release Future Music Exclusively Through Private Members Club

External links

"Interview with Richie Londres –– Sol Invicto & the future" at Deftones.ru
"Sol Invicto interviewed on Noise Creep about the new album"
Deftones announce Sol Invicto Remixes
Noise Creep Announce Remixes for Chi
Guitar World Review - A Reason For Being

Musical groups established in 2006
American alternative metal musical groups